François-Urbain Domergue (24 March 1745 – 29 May 1810) was a French grammarian and journalist known for his Jacobin ideals.

Biography
Born in Aubagne to, the son of an apothecary, Domergue studied in his hometown of Aubagne, Bouches-du-Rhône  and later at an oratory college in Marseille. He became a teacher in Lyon, and married a surgeon's daughter and released the first edition of his Grammaire françoise simplifiée (Simplified French grammar) in 1778. In 1784 he founded the Journal de la Langue Françoise (Journal of the French Language), which had among his objectives to fight against neologisms. After that book didn't sell well, he went to Paris and established a society of amateur French linguists. He had his Grammaire simplifiée book re-edited, collaborated in the Journal général du soir, de politique et de littérature and rereleased his Journal de la Langue Françoise book. He became grammar professor at the École centrale des Quatre-Nations, and later chaired the humanities department at the Lycée Charlemagne in Paris. He was elected to Seat 1 of the Académie française in 1803, and helped commission the Academy's dictionary.

Domerque died in Paris, France, in 1810.

References
Biography from l'Académie française, in French

1745 births
1810 deaths
People from Aubagne
18th-century French journalists
Grammarians from France
Members of the Académie Française
French male non-fiction writers
18th-century French male writers